The following is the 1971–72 network television schedule for the three major English language commercial broadcast networks in the United States. The schedule covers primetime hours from September 1971 through August 1972. The schedule is followed by a list per network of returning series, new series, and series cancelled after the 1970–71 season. All times are Eastern and Pacific, with certain exceptions, such as Monday Night Football. This season would be the first time the prime time schedule would be shortened to three hours (with the exception of Sunday and Tuesday), giving the 7:30 p.m. slot back to local stations, as implemented in the Prime Time Access Rule.

New fall series are highlighted in bold.

Each of the 30 highest-rated shows is listed with its rank and rating as determined by Nielsen Media Research.

 Yellow indicates the programs in the top 10 for the season.
 Cyan indicates the programs in the top 20 for the season.
 Magenta indicates the programs in the top 30 for the season.

The Public Broadcasting Service was in operation, but the schedule was set by each local station.

Sunday 

Note: 60 Minutes aired at 6:00-7:00 pm on CBS from January to June 1972.

Monday

Tuesday 

Note: The NBC 1972 summer series Ponderosa consisted of reruns of Bonanza episodes from the 1967-1970 period. More recent reruns of Bonanza also aired that summer under the shows original name in its regular Sunday evening time slot.  NBC Action Playhouse consisted of reruns from Bob Hope Presents the Chrysler Theatre, with new introductions by Peter Marshall.

Wednesday 

Note: The ABC 1972 summer series ABC Comedy Hour Presents the Kopykats consisted of reruns of ABC Comedy Hour from earlier in the year.

Thursday 

Note: My World and Welcome to It consisted of reruns of NBC's 1969-70 sitcom.

Friday

Saturday

By network

ABC

Returning Series
The ABC Sunday Night Movie
ABC NFL Monday Night Football
ABC Movie of the Week
Alias Smith and Jones
Bewitched
The Brady Bunch
The Courtship of Eddie's Father
The F.B.I.
Love, American Style
Marcus Welby, M.D.
The Mod Squad
Nanny and the Professor
The Odd Couple
The Partridge Family
Room 222
The Smith Family

New Series
The ABC Comedy Hour *
The Corner Bar *
Getting Together
The Ken Berry 'Wow' Show *
Longstreet
The Man and the City
The Marty Feldman Comedy Machine *
Monday Night Special *
Movie of the Weekend
Owen Marshall, Counselor at Law
The Persuaders!
Shirley's World
The Sixth Sense *
The Super *

Not returning from 1970–71:
Barefoot in the Park
Dan August
Danny Thomas in Make Room for Granddaddy
The Immortal
It Was a Very Good Year
The Johnny Cash Show
The Lawrence Welk Show (moved to syndication)
Let's Make a Deal
Matt Lincoln
The Most Deadly Game
The Newlywed Game (remained on its daytime lineup)
The Pearl Bailey Show
The Reel Game
The Silent Force
That Girl
This Is Tom Jones
The Val Doonican Show
The Young Lawyers
The Young Rebels

CBS

Returning Series
60 Minutes
All in the Family
Arnie
The Carol Burnett Show
CBS Thursday Night Movie
The Doris Day Show
The Glen Campbell Goodtime Hour
Gunsmoke
Hawaii Five-O
Here's Lucy
Mannix
The Mary Tyler Moore Show
Medical Center
Mission: Impossible
My Three Sons
The Sonny & Cher Comedy Hour
Suspense Theatre

New Series
Bearcats!
Cade's County
Cannon
The Chicago Teddy Bears
The David Steinberg Show *
The Don Rickles Show *
Funny Face *
The Jerry Reed When You're Hot You're Hot Hour *
The John Byner Comedy Hour *
The Life of Leonardo da Vinci *
Me and the Chimp *
The New Dick Van Dyke Show
O'Hara, U.S. Treasury

Not returning from 1970–71:
Animal World
The Beverly Hillbillies
The CBS Newcomers
Comedy Playhouse
The Ed Sullivan Show
Family Affair
The Governor & J.J.
Green Acres
Headmaster
Hee Haw (moved to syndication)
Hogan's Heroes
The Ice Palace
The Interns
The Jim Nabors Hour
Lassie (moved to syndication)
Mayberry R.F.D.
The New Andy Griffith Show
Storefront Lawyers
The Tim Conway Comedy Hour
To Rome with Love

NBC

Returning Series
Adam-12
Bonanza
The Bold Ones
Columbo
The Dean Martin Show
The Flip Wilson Show
Ironside
McCloud
Monday Night Baseball
NBC Action Playhouse
NBC Monday Night at the Movies
The NBC Mystery Movie
NBC Saturday Night at the Movies
Night Gallery
Rowan & Martin's Laugh-In
The Wonderful World of Disney

New Series
The D.A.Dean Martin Presents the Bobby Darin Amusement Co. *
Emergency! *
The Funny Side
The Good Life
The Jimmy Stewart Show
McMillan & Wife
Nichols
The Partners
Sanford and Son *
Sarge

Not returning from 1970–71:
The Andy Williams Show
The Bill Cosby Show
Bracken's World
The Des O'Connor Show
The Don Knotts Show
Four in One
From a Bird's Eye View
The High Chaparral
Julia
Kraft Music Hall
Make Your Own Kind of Music
The Men from Shiloh
The Name of the Game
Nancy
NBC Comedy Theater
The Psychiatrist
The Red Skelton Show
San Francisco International Airport
Strange Report
Wild Kingdom

Note: The * indicates that the program was introduced in midseason.

References

Additional sources
 Castleman, H. & Podrazik, W. (1982). Watching TV: Four Decades of American Television. New York: McGraw-Hill. 314 pp.
 McNeil, Alex. Total Television. Fourth edition. New York: Penguin Books. .
 Brooks, Tim & Marsh, Earle (1985). The Complete Directory to Prime Time Network TV Shows (3rd ed.). New York: Ballantine. .

United States primetime network television schedules
1971 in American television
1972 in American television